Park West (originally the Lane Court Theatre) is a concert venue located in Chicago, Illinois. The theater opened in 1916 as a vaudeville and movie theater by the Ascher Brothers. Currently, it can house up to 1,000 guests, in a general admission setting.

About
The theater opened in the 1910s, with a capacity of 1,000 people. In 1965, the theater became the "Town Theatre", eventually showing adult films and featuring live burlesque by 1967. In the 1970s, it was purchased by Dale Niedermaier and John May, refurbished and reopened as "Park West", the music venue and special events space May 11, 1977. The theater hosts a variety of bands, most of which perform classic rock or alternative rock.  It is also home to many fundraising events, including the Starlight Foundation's "Dream Date Auction", and awards ceremonies, including the annual "Non-Equity Jeff Awards".

Noted performers

Adele
Aimee Mann
Ani DiFranco
Anthony Newley
Aretha Franklin
Beth Hart
Blondie (band)
Charlie Puth
Chicago
Chickenfoot
Cyndi Lauper
The Dandy Warhols
The Darkness
The Derek Trucks Band
Don McLean
Dionne Warwick
Duran Duran
Eurythmics
Elton John
Fall Out Boy
Gary Numan
Gene Simmons
Genesis
Gil Scott-Heron
Gloria Gaynor
Grace Jones
Hall & Oates
Halsey
Jamie Cullum
John Prine
Jon McLaughlin
Kate Nash
King Crimson
Logic
Lucinda Williams
Neil Sedaka
Oh My Girl
Paloma Faith
Patti Smith
Paula Cole
Pete Yorn
The Police
Prince
Rakim
Lou Reed
Renaissance
Rory Gallagher
Saint Etienne
Shawn Colvin
Sister Sledge
Tegan and Sara
Trixie Mattel
Tina Turner
Tom Odell
U2
Van Morrison
Whitney Houston
"Weird Al" Yankovic

Live media production venue
1980: Dionne Warwick:Live at Parkwest—broadcast of a 1980 concert by Dionne Warwick, as a part of the Soundstage series.
1982: The Name Of This Band Is Talking Heads—a live album by Talking Heads. Features a live recording of "The Big Country" from 1978.
1983: Tina Turner: Live in Chicago—broadcast of a 1983 concert by Tina Turner, as a part of the Soundstage series.
1985: Aretha Franklin: Live at Park West—broadcast of a 1985 concert by Aretha Franklin, as a part of the Soundstage series.
1985: I Have a Pony— comedy album by Steven Wright, recorded at Wolfgang's in San Francisco and Park West.
1996: Costello & Nieve—a live album by Elvis Costello and Steve Nieve. Features five songs recorded at the theater in 1996
1997: Home—single released by Sheryl Crow. Contains four tracks recorded at the theater in March 1997.
1998: Live from the Choirgirl Hotel—radio and web broadcast of a concert by Tori Amos.
2001: Live—a live album by J. J. Cale.
2005: Arriving Somewhere..., a live DVD by Porcupine Tree released in 2006 and 2008.
2006: Songlines Live—a live album by The Derek Trucks Band.
2010: Live in Chicago—a live album by Renaissance from their 1983 tour.
2015: September '78''—a live album by John Prine recorded at the theater in 1978.

References

External links

Music venues in Chicago